Eilema aspersoides is a moth of the subfamily Arctiinae first described by Hervé de Toulgoët in 1957. It is found on Madagascar.

References

aspersoides